The Men's short race at the 2006 IAAF World Cross Country Championships was held at the Umi-no-nakamichi Seaside Park in Fukuoka, Japan, on April 1, 2006.  Reports of the event were given in The New York Times, and for the IAAF.

Complete results for individuals, for teams, medallists, and the results of British athletes who took part were published.

Race results

Men's short race (4 km)

Individual

Teams

Note: Athletes in parentheses did not score for the team result.

Participation
According to an unofficial count, 128 athletes from 34 countries participated in the Men's short race.  The announced athlete from  did not show.

 (6)
 (5)
 (1)
 (1)
 (6)
 (4)
 (6)
 (1)
 (1)
 (4)
 (6)
 (5)
 (1)
 (1)
 (6)
 (6)
 (6)
 (1)
 (6)
 (1)
 (4)
 (5)
 (4)
 (2)
 (2)
 (6)
 (6)
 (5)
 (1)
 (1)
 (5)
 (5)
 (6)
 (2)

See also
 2006 IAAF World Cross Country Championships – Senior men's race
 2006 IAAF World Cross Country Championships – Junior men's race
 2006 IAAF World Cross Country Championships – Senior women's race
 2006 IAAF World Cross Country Championships – Women's short race
 2006 IAAF World Cross Country Championships – Junior women's race

References

Men's short race at the IAAF World Cross Country Championships
IAAF World Cross Country Championships